Music for Earthworms is American hip hop artist Aesop Rock's debut album. The album was recorded during summers and other occasions on which Aesop Rock would return home to New York City from college at Boston University. It was mostly recorded in a Manhattan studio where Dub-L and Plain Pat were working as interns. Although the studio was not typically used as a recording studio, it was equipped with impressive technology for the time, including Digital Audio Tape machines, ADAT machines and CD drives capable of burning discs. Aesop Rock's vocals were recorded on an SM58 microphone.

Music for Earthworms was ultimately self-distributed. As an unsigned artist, Aesop Rock was responsible for cutting out the album covers and burning the album onto CDs himself.

Aesop Rock references the album and its rarity on his 2002 EP Daylight in the track "Alchemy." Blueprint asks:

"So why they blaming you for the cats that sleep while the earth turns?"

Aesop Rock responds:

"Yeah I had em' up all night praying I'd re-release Music For Earthworms."

Track listing

References

1997 debut albums
Aesop Rock albums
Albums produced by Aesop Rock